The 2014–15 Stal Dniprodzerzhynsk season is Stal's first Ukrainian Premier League season, and their third season under manager Volodymyr Mazyar. During the season Stal Dniprodzerzhynsk will compete in the Ukrainian Premier League and in the Ukrainian Cup.

Friendly matches

Pre-season

Competitions

Premier League

League table

Results summary

Results by round

Matches

Ukrainian Cup

Notes

Squad statistics

Appearances and goals

|-
|colspan="14"|Players who left Stal Dniprodzerzhynsk during the season :

|}

Goalscorers

Disciplinary record

References

External links 

Official website

Stal Dniprodzerzhynsk
FC Stal Kamianske
Stal Dniprodzerzhynsk